Nezihe Muhiddin Tepedelengil (1889 – 10 February 1958) was a Turkish women's rights activist, suffragette, journalist, writer and political leader.

In the 20th century Ottoman Empire, Nezihe Muhiddin was a pioneer of the women's movement who fought to ensure the recognition of women's political rights after declaration of republican regime. She became one of leading names of the First Wave Republican feminists. Even before the establishment of the Republican People's Party, Nezihe Muhiddin completed the formation of Women's People's Party (KHF) in 1923 and became the founder of the first political party in Turkey. She also served  as a president of the Women's Union between 1924-1927 and helped the founding process of the journal named Turk Kadin Yolu.

She is a writer who has written 20 novels, 300 stories, playings, screenplays, operettas.

Life

Early life and education 
She was born in Kandilli, Istanbul in 1889. She’s the daughter of a prosecutor and criminal judge Mr. Muhiddin. She completed her education with lessons from private teachers and did not receive higher education. She studied privately at home and learned Persian, Arabic, German, French. From her early teenage years, she grew up liable to political and social issues and the state of being a woman. Nezihe Muhiddin’s cousin and her mother’s debates and discussion on literature and social problems led the way of Muhiddin’s ideology.

She expresses that she sees the greatest contribution in terms of education from her cousin Nakiye Hanım. According to her, Nakiye Hanım is an exemplary Turkish woman who has experienced the modern type of woman, so her thoughts carry a lot of traces from her.

She kept using her father’s surname, Muhiddin, in her literary works instead of the surname of his second husband.

Career and literary works 
She is the founder of the first party of the Republic of Turkey, Kadınlar Halk Fırkası (People's Party for Women or Women's People Party) in July 1923. KHF was founded for the political and social rights of women. Due to the political situation during the time, it was not recognized officially by the modern Turkish state.

Muhiddin then founded Türk Kadınlar Birliği (Turkish Women's Union) with Latife Bekir. Türk Kadınlar Birliği continued to press for political equality. In 1927 the Union decided to promote a feminist male candidate to champion women's rights in the parliament, but he was unsuccessful.

She spent her life working to improve the quality of the lives of Turkish women.

Nezihe Muhiddin wrote novels that studied women's problems and criticized men's attitudes in marriages. Her first novel, "Şebâb-ı Tebah” (Disappearing Youth), was published in 1911. Muhiddin started her career at the age of twenty and served many duties. She wrote articles in magazines and newspapers, one of the most important works among them was Kadın Yolu Dergisi between 1925-1926. Throughout her life, she wrote 20 novels, 300 stories, play, operettas, screenplays. She translated works of world writers such as Goethe and Edgar Allan Poe.

In 1913, she took part in the establishment of the charity named "Turkish Ladies Protection Association” and also became the secretariat of the association. Moreover, she was one of the founders of the Women's Branch of the “Donanma Cemiyeti” which was established to support the Ottoman navy. However, when she was doing charity work, the main issue on her mind was unity of women and their participation in political life.

Muhiddin, in her work called Turkish Women, states that she learned the notion of femininity from the women she grew up within the same environment and her actions were shaped by feeding on their ideas.

She worked as a Directorate of İttihad ve Terakki Kız Sanayi Mehteb and published many novels and stories. She took important positions in associations, congregation, and communities that were founded by women. In 1927, the Union chose to advance a male contender for parliament, which ended up being ineffective. That very year, Nezihe Muhiddin was accused of debasement as the seat of the Union and had to leave her position. The Turkish Women's Union disbanded in 1935, and it was invited to join the semi-official People's Houses, like many similar autonomous organizations.

Nezihe Muhiddin was threatened, disregarded, and discarded by a series of prosecutions, both by the state authorities and by her female companions. As a result of the intimidation and deletion policies of that period, she did (could) not engage in political activity after the 1930s and focused on her author identity. She wrote many stories and novels.

On February 10, 1958, she died in a mental hospital located in İstanbul.

Publications

Books
 Şebab-ı Tebah (The Lost Youth)
 Benliğim benimdir (My Ego is Mine)
 Güzellik Kraliçesi (The Beauty Queen)
 Boz Kurt (The Grey Wolf)
 İstanbul'da Bir Landru (A Landru in Istanbul)
 Ateş Böcekleri (Fire Flies)
 Bir Aşk Böyle Bitti (This is How A Love Ended)
 Çıplak Model (The Naked Model)
 İzmir Çocuğu (The Child of Izmir)
 Avare Kadın (Wastrel Woman)
 Bir Yaz Gecesiydi (It Was a Summer Night)
 Çıngıraklı Yılan (The Rattlesnake)
 Kalbim Senindir (My Heart Belongs To You)
 Sabah Oluyor (Turning Out to be Morning)
 Gene Geleceksin (You Will Come Back)
 Sus Kalbim Sus! (Shush, My Heart, Shush!)
 Türk Kadını (Turkish Woman)

References

Further reading 
 " Nezihe Muhitin ve Türk Kadini, by Ayşegül Baykan & Belma Ötüş Baskett. Published by Iletisim, 1999
 Nezihe Muhiddin: an Ottoman Turkish women's rights defender" by Yaprak Zihnioglu.
 Kadınsız İnkılap/ Nezihe Muhiddin, Kadınlar Halk Fırkası, Kadın Birliği. by Yaprak Zihnioğlu, Metis Yayınları 2003
  Nezihe Muhiddin külliyatı by Yaprak Zihnioğlu
 Osmanlı Kadın Hareketi'' by Serpil Çakır

External links
 Historical Roots of the Turkish Women's Movement
 Late Ottoman and Early Turkish women activists. Yeni Şafak Newspaper Article in Turkish.
 Ottoman Women's Movement, Turkish article in Radikal Newspaper
 Muhiddin, life and books. Radikal Newspaper Article in Turkish. 
 Bir milletin nisvânı, derece-i terâkkisinin mizânıdır. SesOnline Article by Ayse Hur in Turkish
 

Feminist writers
1889 births
1958 deaths
Turkish writers
Turkish activists
Turkish women activists
Turkish feminists
Multicultural feminism
Feminism and history
20th-century Turkish women politicians
Leaders of political parties in Turkey
20th-century women from the Ottoman Empire
Turkish women writers
Suffragists